is a Japanese rower. She was born in Nagano Prefecture. She competed in the Women's lightweight double sculls at the 2012 Summer Olympics, reaching the semi-finals with her teammate Atsumi Fukumoto and ranking 12th overall. She competed in the same event at the 2000, 2004 and 2008 Summer Olympics, finishing 9th, 14th and 13th respectively. She won a silver medal in the Women's double sculls at the 2002 Asian Games. She also won a silver medal in the Women's lightweight double sculls at the 2006 Asian Games, and another silver medal in the Women's lightweight double sculls at the 2010 Asian Games.

References

External links
 
 

1978 births
Living people
Japanese female rowers
Nippon Sport Science University alumni
Olympic rowers of Japan
Rowers at the 2000 Summer Olympics
Rowers at the 2004 Summer Olympics
Rowers at the 2008 Summer Olympics
Rowers at the 2012 Summer Olympics
Asian Games medalists in rowing
Rowers at the 1998 Asian Games
Rowers at the 2002 Asian Games
Rowers at the 2006 Asian Games
Rowers at the 2010 Asian Games
Sportspeople from Nagano Prefecture
Asian Games silver medalists for Japan
Medalists at the 1998 Asian Games
Medalists at the 2002 Asian Games
Medalists at the 2006 Asian Games
Medalists at the 2010 Asian Games
21st-century Japanese women